This is a list of cases reported in volume 287 of United States Reports, decided by the Supreme Court of the United States in 1932 and 1933.

Justices of the Supreme Court at the time of volume 287 U.S. 

The Supreme Court is established by Article III, Section 1 of the Constitution of the United States, which says: "The judicial Power of the United States, shall be vested in one supreme Court . . .". The size of the Court is not specified; the Constitution leaves it to Congress to set the number of justices. Under the Judiciary Act of 1789 Congress originally fixed the number of justices at six (one chief justice and five associate justices). Since 1789 Congress has varied the size of the Court from six to seven, nine, ten, and back to nine justices (always including one chief justice).

When the cases in volume 287 were decided the Court comprised the following nine members:

Notable Cases in 287 U.S.

Powell v. Alabama
Powell v. Alabama,  287 U.S. 45 (1932), is a landmark Supreme Court decision in which the Court reversed the convictions of nine young black men for allegedly raping two white women on a freight train near Scottsboro, Alabama. The majority of the Court reasoned that the right to retain and be represented by a lawyer was fundamental to a fair trial and that at least in some circumstances, the trial judge must inform a defendant of this right. In addition, if the defendant cannot afford a lawyer, the court must appoint one sufficiently far in advance of trial to permit the lawyer to prepare adequately for the trial.

Powell was the first time the Court had reversed a state criminal conviction for a violation of a criminal procedural provision of the United States Bill of Rights. In effect, it held that the Fourteenth Amendment Due Process Clause included at least part of the right to counsel referred to in the Sixth Amendment, making that much of the Bill of Rights binding on the states. Before Powell, the Court had reversed state criminal convictions only for racial discrimination in jury selection — a practice that violated the Equal Protection Clause of the Fourteenth Amendment.

Butler dissented, writing that he would uphold the convictions and death sentences, ignoring the circumstances surrounding the convictions; McReynolds joined the dissent.

Sorrells v. United States
In Sorrells v. United States,   287 U.S. 435 (1932), the Supreme Court unanimously recognized the entrapment defense. However, while the majority opinion by Chief Justice Charles Evans Hughes located the key to entrapment in the defendant's predisposition or lack thereof to commit the crime, Justice Owen Josephus Roberts' concurring opinion proposed instead that it be rooted in an analysis of the conduct of the law enforcement agents making the arrest. Although the Court has stuck with the predisposition analysis, the dispute has hung over entrapment jurisprudence ever since.

Federal court system 

Under the Judiciary Act of 1789 the federal court structure at the time comprised District Courts, which had general trial jurisdiction; Circuit Courts, which had mixed trial and appellate (from the US District Courts) jurisdiction; and the United States Supreme Court, which had appellate jurisdiction over the federal District and Circuit courts—and for certain issues over state courts. The Supreme Court also had limited original jurisdiction (i.e., in which cases could be filed directly with the Supreme Court without first having been heard by a lower federal or state court). There were one or more federal District Courts and/or Circuit Courts in each state, territory, or other geographical region.

The Judiciary Act of 1891 created the United States Courts of Appeals and reassigned the jurisdiction of most routine appeals from the district and circuit courts to these appellate courts. The Act created nine new courts that were originally known as the "United States Circuit Courts of Appeals." The new courts had jurisdiction over most appeals of lower court decisions. The Supreme Court could review either legal issues that a court of appeals certified or decisions of court of appeals by writ of certiorari. On January 1, 1912, the effective date of the Judicial Code of 1911, the old Circuit Courts were abolished, with their remaining trial court jurisdiction transferred to the U.S. District Courts.

List of cases in volume 287 U.S. 

[a] Brandeis took no part in the case
[b] Butler took no part in the case
[c] Hughes took no part in the case

Notes and references

External links
  Case reports in volume 287 from Library of Congress
  Case reports in volume 287 from Court Listener
  Case reports in volume 287 from the Caselaw Access Project of Harvard Law School
  Case reports in volume 287 from Google Scholar
  Case reports in volume 287 from Justia
  Case reports in volume 287 from Open Jurist
 Website of the United States Supreme Court
 United States Courts website about the Supreme Court
 National Archives, Records of the Supreme Court of the United States
 American Bar Association, How Does the Supreme Court Work?
 The Supreme Court Historical Society